Planipapillus cyclus is a species of velvet worm in the Peripatopsidae family. This species is oviparous, has 15 pairs of legs, and lives in logs in wet forests. It is found in Victoria, Australia.

References

Onychophorans of Australasia
Onychophoran species
Animals described in 2000